This is the list of prosecuted lèse majesté cases in Thailand.

Notable cases

See also 
Lèse-majesté in Thailand

References 

Lèse majesté in Thailand